Ace York Caesar Asturias Aguilar (November 20, 1954 – December 15, 2007), better known as Ace Vergel, was a Filipino actor dubbed "The Original Bad Boy of Philippine Movies". He was the son of the late film actors Alicia Vergel and César Ramírez, and brother of actress Beverly Vergel.

Early life
He was born Ace York Caesar Asturias Aguilar in the Philippines on November 20, 1954 to parents Alicia Vergel and Cesar Ramirez. His parents were well-known stars in the 1950s.

He attended Business Management and Public Relations at Ateneo de Manila University in 1975.

He was married to Maya dela Cuesta and had a son named Alejandro King dela Cuesta Aguilar

Film career
Ace Vergel, being a "Child of Cinema" started in the film industry at the age of 3. His screen debut was in "Taong Putik" which starred his mother. He appeared in his first full-length movie at the age of five using his real name Ace York, where he played the friend of a giant bird in the 1959 film Anak ng Bulkan. The movie starred Fernando Poe Jr. and Edna Luna.
At the age of 7, Ace dropped out of the movie scene as he reached school age.

In 1969 At the age of 15 he made a movie comeback and was paired with Nora Aunor in a musical "Nineteeners" but the chemistry didn't work and decided to bid the movie scene goodbye again. He staged his comeback in 1977 to do the film under Lino Brocka entitled "Inay" where his mother Alicia Vergel portrayed the title role. In the following year,
Vergel switched from drama to action roles. The movie gained positive reviews and made it to the box office. The movie stablished him as the newest action sensation during that time.

Vergel is the first movie star that appeared in a miniseries. The FIRST ever Philippine Miniseries entitled “Malayo Pa Ang Umaga.” is based on the first Filipino novel in English, “Without Seeing the Dawn “by Stevan Javellana. He played the main character “Mario” an oppressed farmer. Set during the Japanese occupation of the Philippines, It was aired in channel 9 in seven installments during the summer of 1979. Rey Valera was chosen to compose the theme song of the miniseries.

In 1983, Vergel "aced" up a very challenging role in a classic movie "Pieta." His role as "Rigor" an anti-hero who lack of heroic attributes which differs from his usual role in his past movies  became his most popular character. Pieta, to this day is considered  by his fans as  Ace Vergel's signature film. 

Vergel has 5 Award Nominations. 

FAMAS NOMINATION 

1989 Best Actor for. "Anak Ng Cabron" (1988)

1986 Best Actor for "Bomba Arienda" (1985)

1985 Best Actor for "Basag Ang Pula" (1984)

1984 Best Actor for "Pieta" (1983)

GAWAD URIAN NOMINATION

1986 Best Actor for "Bomba Arienda" (1985)

In 1989, Vergel received his Best Actor awards from the Gawad Urian and PMPC Star Awards for Movies for his role in the film "Anak ng Cabron."

He had the lead role in the 1996 film Seth Corteza, which was about a man who inherits turf in the criminal underworld. He wants to make changes and faces the dangers that come about as a result. The film was directed by Efren C. Piñon.

In 2003, Vergel appeared in his last film Masamang Ugat from Viva Films.

Controversies
In August 2007, a warrant for arrest was issued in Caloocan for rape cases filed against him in 2000, but he was later released. He was also linked to illegal drugs, but the cases against him were dismissed.

Death
Vergel suffered a massive heart attack and slip into coma at The Chinese General Hospital and Medical Center, located in Santa Cruz, Manila and  died  at 3:17 am on December 15, 2007, at the age of 53.

Filmography

References

  7. Page 29 Expressweek/April 5, 1979

External links
 

1952 births
2007 deaths
Filipino male film actors
Filipino male child actors
Filipino people of Spanish descent